Parliamentary elections were held in Greece on 27 January 1873. The United Opposition won 95 of the 190 seats. Epameinondas Deligiorgis remained Prime Minister.

Results

References

Greece
Parliamentary elections in Greece
1873 in Greece
Greece
1870s in Greek politics